This is a list of members of the Australian Senate from 1 July 1978 to 30 June 1981. Half of the state senators were elected at the December 1975 election and had terms due to finish on 30 June 1981; the other half of the state senators were elected at the December 1977 election and had terms due to finish on 30 June 1984. The territory senators were elected at the December 1977 election and their terms ended at the dissolution of the House of Representatives, which was October 1980.

Notes

References

Members of Australian parliaments by term
20th-century Australian politicians
Australian Senate lists